Deena Michelle Kastor (née Drossin; born February 14, 1973) is an American long-distance runner. She was a holder of American records in the marathon (2006-2022) and numerous road distances. She won the bronze medal in the women's marathon at the 2004 Olympics in Athens, Greece. She is also an eight-time national champion in cross country.

Early and personal life
Kastor is Jewish, and was born in Waltham, Massachusetts.  She is an alumna of Agoura High School located in Agoura Hills, California. She ran collegiately for the University of Arkansas.

She is married to Andrew Kastor. In August 2010, they announced that she was three months pregnant with their first child, Piper. As a result, she announced she would not compete in that year's New York City Marathon, held November 7. Her daughter was born in February 2011.

Career highlights
In high school, Kastor won three California state cross country titles and two CIF California State Meet titles at 3200 meters while running for Agoura High School in Agoura Hills, California. She also competed in the Foot Locker Cross Country Championships all four years of her prep career, and competed in both the North American Youth Maccabi Games and the Pan-American Maccabiah while in high school.

At the University of Arkansas she was a four-time SEC champion and an eight-time All-American. Post-collegiately, Kastor ran under coaches Joe Vigil and Terrence Mahon. Since 2015, she has been coached by her husband, Andrew Kastor, head of the Mammoth Track Club.

Kastor has earned two silver medals (2002 Dublin, long race; 2003 Lausanne, long race) in the IAAF World Cross Country Championships.

She holds U.S. records in the following events:

 Women's road 10 mile (set at the 2006 Berlin Half Marathon with a time of 51:31)
 Women's road 15K (set at the 2003 Gate River Run in Jacksonville with a time of 47:15)
 Women's road 8K (set at the 2005 The LaSalle Bank Shamrock Shuffle in Chicago with a time of 24:36)

Kastor formerly held the following records:
 Women's marathon (set when winning the 2006 Flora London Marathon with a time of 2:19:36)
 Women's half marathon (set at the 2006 Berlin Half Marathon with a time of 1:07:34)
 Women's 10,000 metres (set at Stanford in 2002 with a time of 30:50.32)
 Women's road 5K (set at the 2002 Carlsbad 5000 with a time of 14:54)

In recent years, Kastor has shifted her focus toward the marathon distance. After winning the bronze medal at the 2004 Olympic Marathon, she won the 2005 Chicago Marathon. In 2006, she won the London Marathon, setting an American record until Keira D'Amato broke record on 16 January 2022 (Houston Marathon) taking 24 second off (2:19:12). She placed sixth at the 2006 New York City Marathon and fifth at the 2007 Boston Marathon.
Kastor is a featured subject in the 2007 marathon documentary Spirit of the Marathon, which follows her victory at the 2005 Chicago Marathon.

2008
In April 2008, Kastor won the U.S. women's Olympic marathon trials in Boston, Massachusetts. She finished with an unofficial time of 2:29:35, after overtaking competitor Magdalena Lewy Boulet in mile 23. Kastor ran most of the race from behind, while Lewy Boulet built a commanding lead very early on, running alone for most of the marathon. Lewy Boulet took second place in 2:30:19.

In August 2008, Kastor pulled out of the women's marathon at the Beijing Olympics with a foot injury. At about the  mark, she dropped to one knee, holding her right foot. She attempted to rise, but dropped back down again and was forced to withdraw from the race.

2010

On March 21, 2010, Kastor competed in the first spring running of the New York City Half Marathon. After running the majority of the race in first, on her way to breaking the course record, she dropped to second place to finish behind Great Britain's Mara Yamauchi.

It was announced in August 2010 that Kastor and her husband were expecting their first child, Piper Bloom, in March 2011. It was also announced that Deena would be making her return to racing at the New York Mini 10K.

2012
In January 2012, Deena ran 2:30:40 to place 6th at the Olympic Squad Houston Olympic Trials.

2013

In January 2013, Kastor announced she would be running in the 2013 Los Angeles Marathon, to be held on March 17, 2013 where she finished third in 2:32:39.

On August 10, 2013, Kastor placed 9th at the World Championship Marathon in Moscow with a time of 2:36. She stated that it may have been her last high-level marathon.

2014

In April 2014, the 41-year-old Kastor won the 2014 More|Fitness Half-Marathon in New York's Central Park in a U.S. masters record of 1:11:38. 

On September 21, 2014, she set the world record in the Women's Masters division for the half-marathon, at 1:09:39, while running in the Rock 'n' Roll Half-Marathon in Philadelphia.

2015

In October 2015, she broke the U.S. Women's Masters marathon record by almost a minute at the 2015 Chicago Marathon, running 2:27:47.

Awards and rankings
Kastor was selected as the top women's marathoner in the world in 2006 by Track and Field News magazine.

Among the honors Kastor has received from the USATF are:

2003 Jesse Owens Award as the top female track and field athlete in the US
USATF Runner of the Year in 2001, 2003, 2004 and 2008
C.C. Jackson Award in 2002, 2003 and 2004
USATF Female Cross Country Athlete of the Year in 2001 and 2003, and as a team member in 2002 when the US team finished second at the World Cross Country Championships 8 kilometer run

She was inducted into the New York Jewish Sports Hall of Fame in 2001, and into the National Jewish Sports Hall of Fame on April 29, 2007. In 2003 she was inducted into the Southern California Jewish Sports Hall of Fame.

See also
 List of select Jewish track and field athletes

Notes

References

External links
 
 
 

1973 births
Living people
People from Mammoth Lakes, California
Sportspeople from Waltham, Massachusetts
Track and field athletes from California
Track and field athletes from Massachusetts
American female long-distance runners
American female marathon runners
American female cross country runners
Olympic female marathon runners
Olympic bronze medalists for the United States in track and field
Athletes (track and field) at the 2000 Summer Olympics
Athletes (track and field) at the 2004 Summer Olympics
Athletes (track and field) at the 2008 Summer Olympics
Medalists at the 2004 Summer Olympics
Universiade medalists in athletics (track and field)
Chicago Marathon female winners
London Marathon female winners
Jewish American sportspeople
Jewish female athletes (track and field)
University of Arkansas alumni
Arkansas Razorbacks women's track and field athletes
Universiade gold medalists for the United States
Medalists at the 1997 Summer Universiade
21st-century American Jews
21st-century American women